North Korea–Serbia relations (Korean:쓰르비아-조선민주주의인민공화국관계) are the bilateral relations between Serbia and North Korea.
The Socialist Federal Republic of Yugoslavia and the Democratic People's Republic of Korea had established diplomatic relations on October 30, 1948. Relations had been very close during the time of Josip Broz Tito and Kim Il-sung. Both leaders had taken a neutral stance during the Sino-Soviet split and maintained friendly relations with both the Soviet Union and China. Both Serbia and North Korea are members of the Non-Aligned Movement. Yugoslavia, of which Serbia was a part, was one of the movement's founding members. Both countries closed their embassies in each other's capitals in October and November 2001, respectively, for financial reasons. Nevertheless, they continue to enjoy a close relationship. The Serbian Embassy to North Korea is accredited from Beijing, China, and the North Korean embassy to Serbia is accredited from Bucharest, Romania.

Bilateral agreements 
May 25, 1971: agreement on trade and payments.
September 4, 1973: agreement on the abolition of visas between the two countries.
November 4, 1974: agreement on cultural cooperation.
February 22, 1975: agreement on the setting up of a consultative commission for economic and scientific-technical cooperation.
November 6, 1975: agreement on air services.
December 11, 1975: agreement on cooperation in telecommunications.
February 20, 1978: agreement on cooperation in the fields of health, medical science and pharmaceuticals.
September 20, 1978: agreement on providing health services free of charge to the diplomatic personnel and members of their families on a reciprocal basis.
March 4, 1982: agreement on the mutual abolition of visas between the SFRY and the DPR of Korea for citizens of the two countries holding ordinary passports when travelling on business.
November 15, 1995: protocol concerning cooperation between the Federal Ministry of Foreign Affairs of the FRY and the Ministry of Foreign Affairs of the DPR of Korea.
December 3, 1997: agreed minutes between the Federal Republic of Yugoslavia and the Democratic People's Republic of Korea regarding the treaties in force between the two countries.
August 26, 1998: agreement on the mutual promotion and protection of investments.
March 15, 2001: cultural exchange programme between the Federal Government of the Federal Republic of Yugoslavia and the Government of the DPR of Korea for the years 2001–2003.

Trade relations 
Under President Slobodan Milosevic, Serbia had a very close relationship with North Korea. It was rumoured that North Korean students came to study in Belgrade. Yet trade between Yugoslavia and North Korea was very limited, worth roughly 1.37 million Euros.

Yugoslav Wars 
During the 1999 NATO bombing of Yugoslavia, the North Korean government strongly condemned NATO action against Serbia. The North Korean foreign minister Paek Man Sun expressed his full support of the Serbian government against NATO, and urged the world community to prevent the United States from using military force in Kosovo.

In February 2000, a Workers' Party of Korea delegation participated in the fourth congress of the Socialist Party of Serbia, and representative Kim Man Ik delivered a speech condemning American imperialism in the Yugoslav Wars, and expressed his solidarity with the Serbian government and Slobodan Milošević. Regarding Serbia's military action in Kosovo, Kim said, "The people and armed forces of Yugoslavia, determined to defend to the end the sovereignty of the country, turned out valiantly in a sacred war against the aggression of the US-led NATO forces and fully demonstrated to the rest of the world their indefatigable will and heroic stamina."

Further Relations 

In March 2017, North Korean Ambassador Ri Pyong Du visited Belgrade and reaffirmed North Korea's support of Serbia's position on Kosovo. Here Serbian foreign minister Ivica Dacic stressed the need for a diplomatic solution to the North Korean crisis.

See also

Foreign relations of North Korea
Foreign relations of Serbia
Kosovo–North Korea relations
Yugoslavia and the Non-Aligned Movement

References

External links 

 Serbian Ministry of Foreign Affairs about the relations with North Korea
 Serbian embassy in Beijing (also accredited to North Korea)

 
Bilateral relations of Serbia
Serbia